Fury of the Pagans (also known as The Fury of the Barbarians and Toryok), is a 1960 Italian adventure film  directed by Guido Malatesta.

Cast 

 Edmund Purdom: Toryok
 Rossana Podestà: Leonora
 Livio Lorenzon: Kovo
 Daniele Vargas: Napur
 Andrea Fantasia: Nogaric
 Vittoria Febbi: Daritza
 Raffaella Carrà: Maritza
 Ljubica Jovic: Kathrina

References

External links

1960 films
1960 adventure films
Italian adventure films
Films directed by Guido Malatesta
Films set in the 6th century
1960s Italian films